The 1992 Nigerian Senate election in Delta State was held on July 4, 1992, to elect members of the Nigerian Senate to represent Delta State. Dan Azinge representing Delta North, Francis Okpozo representing Delta South and W.O. Eradajaye representing Delta Central all won on the platform of the Social Democratic Party.

Overview

Summary

Results

Delta North 
The election was won by Dan Azinge of the Social Democratic Party.

Delta South 
The election was won by Francis Okpozo of the Social Democratic Party.

Delta Central 
The election was won by W.O. Eradajaye of the Social Democratic Party.

References 

DEl
Delta State Senate elections
July 1992 events in Nigeria